Juicy Lucy is the debut album by Anglo-American rock band Juicy Lucy, released in 1969. The music is a curiously heavy form of blues-rock, often played at breakneck speed. The album was a moderate success, reaching number 41 on the U.K. album chart but produced a hit single with their version of the Bo Diddley song "Who Do You Love?".

Track listing
Side One
 "Mississippi Woman"  (Juicy Lucy, Ray Owen)
 "Who Do You Love?" (Bo Diddley)
 "She's Mine, She's Yours" (Ellis, Thomas)
 "Just One Time" (Hubbard, Campbell)

Side Two
 "Chicago North-Western" (Hubbard, Campbell) 
 "Train" (Buddy Miles, Rich)
 "Nadine" (Chuck Berry)
 "Are You Satisfied?" (Dobson, Mercer, Thomas)
 "Walking Down The Highway?" (Mercer, Campbell, Owen)

Charts

Personnel
 Ray Owen - lead vocals [tracks 2, 5, 6] - born in 1947 (England), died on 31 October 2018
 Chris Mercer - tenor saxophone, organ, piano - born in 1947
 Neil Hubbard - lead electric and acoustic guitars - born 24 February 1948
 Glenn Ross Campbell - lead vocals [tracks 1, 3, 4, 6-9], steel guitar, backing vocals, mandolin, marimba - born 28 April 1946 (USA)
 Keith Ellis - bass, backing vocals 
 Pete Dobson - drums, percussion - born in 1950 (England)

References

 The Guinness Book of British Hit Albums Fifth Edition 1992
 Original Vertigo Records album sleeve notes

1969 debut albums
Vertigo Records albums
Atco Records albums
Bronze Records albums
Juicy Lucy (band) albums
Albums produced by Gerry Bron
Albums recorded at IBC Studios